Chandler Fashion Center is a regional shopping center located in the city of Chandler, Arizona, and is the second largest mall in the Phoenix metropolitan area. The mall is owned by Macerich and was developed by Westcor a former subsidiary of Macerich. The current anchors are Dillard's, Scheels All Sports (Coming 2023), Macy's and Harkins Theatres. Some premier retailers in the mall include H&M, lululemon, Apple, Urban Outfitters and Express. The mall is located on Chandler Boulevard at the northwest corner of Price Road and Loop 202 (the SanTan Freeway). Chandler Fashion Center serves as a transit center for Valley Metro Bus.

Sales at Chandler Fashion Center are more than $600 per square foot, which is well above the national average of $392 per square foot.

Layout

Chandler Fashion Center is unique among most indoor shopping centers in its design. The mall layout is designed like the letter "A" with the food court as the top point.  All of the indoor mall shops radiate out into 3 wings from the food court. The mall features stone columns, marble floors and large skylights all incorporated in a modern, yet contemporary design. The mall is also a showcase of Arizona scenery courtesy of Arizona Highways. Large photographic murals of the Grand Canyon, Sedona and Arizona's Sonoran Desert are displayed on walls at the ends of each wing as well as certain outdoor entrances to the mall.

Adjacent to the food court entrance of the mall is an outdoor entertainment and dining plaza called The Village. The entertainment and dining options at The Village include the Harkins Theatres, Escape the Room, The Old Spaghetti Factory, Buffalo Wild Wings and BJ's Restaurant & Brewhouse. A popular attraction of the outdoor plaza used to be the Dancing Waters fountain featuring a display of water, lights and music.  The fountains were later demolished in the Summer of 2014 and renovated into a picnic area that featured patio seating, lawn areas, and a children's splash pad.

Surrounding the mall there are many large retail centers including Chandler Festival, Chandler Gateway, Chandler Village Center and the Boulevard Shops at Chandler Fashion Center.

History 
The mall opened on October 19, 2001 with 229 stores and five anchors (Arizona's second Nordstrom, Sears, Dillard's, Robinsons-May and Harkins Theatres).

Originally owned by Westcor, Chandler Fashion Center became part of The Macerich Company's portfolio in 2002.

Robinsons-May converted to Macy's in 2006.

On January 5, 2011, a shootout occurred at the mall with the suspect and two officers, causing a lockdown immediately. The standoff lasted shortly, and police arrested the suspect after his surrender, no deaths or injuries were recorded.

On October 16, 2018, It was announced Sears would shutter as part of an ongoing plan to phase out of brick-and-mortar. Several prospective tenants have been in discussion.

In 2019, the Crayola Experience opened near the food court.

On May 7, 2020, Nordstrom, which maintains one additional outpost in nearby Scottsdale, announced plans to shutter along with several additional locations as a result of the COVID-19 pandemic, focusing on its remaining top performing locations.

On May 19, 2021, it was announced that sporting goods store Scheels will replace the original Nordstrom. It will be the first Scheels All Sports store in the state of Arizona, and is slated to open in fall 2023.

Anchors
 Dillard's
 Macy's
 Scheels All Sports - (Coming 2023)
 Harkins Theatres
 Barnes & Noble

References

External links
 Chandler Fashion Center Official Site
 

Buildings and structures in Chandler, Arizona
Macerich
Shopping malls in Maricopa County, Arizona
Shopping malls established in 2001
2001 establishments in Arizona